Ilkley Toy Museum in Ilkley, West Yorkshire, houses a private collection of toys dating from 350 BC to modern times, and is open to the public, schools, and groups.

Galleries

Ground floor dolls' houses gallery 

At the back is a 1940s English working model fairground automaton, which goes into action when one purchases a token and puts it in the slot placed under the window. See it working here.  
There is also a Hornby clockwork train lift.

In this gallery is a large display of furnished dolls' houses, mainly Victorian, and mainly from Germany and England. They include Stafford House (1830)
(see image), 
possibly named after Lancaster House, which was then a topical subject, being still in the process of building. There is an unusual dolls' house of Georgian appearance, with great, twisted pillars at the front, and Georgian furnishings and figures.  

Some of these dolls' houses are miniature shop displays, with minuscule and delicate objects on counters and shelves.  There is thin glassware; there are miniature dolls; there is a tiny shopkeeper with little steel needles, holding real knitting. Tiny modern pieces of delicate crochet or tatting hang in some of these little shops as cloths and bags. The display includes a pet shop
(see image)
and butcher's shop
(see image).

First floor toys gallery 
Here are tin plate toys
(see image)
and lead figures; games; wooden and paper toys in drawers.
Some are Victorian, and some date from the 1950s.  There are boys' dolls made to look like Bond villains, toy soldiers and 1960s toy cars
(see image). 

In a central glass case is an Elastolin Wild West display, 
in which a wagon and horses careers along under its furious driver, while the passenger leans far out with his gun.  Muscular Native Americans in full headdress gallop swiftly around on their pintos. There is much movement in this little display.  The original models for these casts were made with skill, and with an eye for drama which is difficult to capture in a 
photograph.  

Among other items against the window wall is the flat-metal flotilla of Victorian or earlier warships and boats, set at adult eye-level on a glass shelf.  The metal appears to glitter, and the tiny display gives a hint of what it must have been like to view a great fleet in the old days.

First floor dolls gallery 

The oldest exhibit is the 350 BCE
articulated Etruscan ceramic doll
(see image). There is a display of early English wooden dolls, including Miss Barwick, 
dated ca.1750-1760.  She was owned by the Barwick family of West Yeadon, and has a sedan chair with brocade furnishings embossed with a "B". Her face is sculpted with gesso on wood, her eyes are enamelled and her wig is made of real hair
(see image). 

There is Blanche, the Steiff 1910 teddy bear, with her wartime history. She featured in the TV series Trainer, and appears in The Century of the Teddy Bear by Constance King
(see image). 
There is also a Farnell teddy bear of 1920 - a type perhaps more common in England before World War II. The Farnell bears had a hump at the back of the neck, and a lead-weighted tilt growler sewn into the back of the body. As you tipped your bear forward, it emitted a deep growling sound.

References

External links 

 Ilkley Toy Museum website
 www.visitbradford.com: directions to Ilkley Toy Museum by road.
 Image of policeman teddy by Museum door.
 Yell.com: send-to-mobile facility for directions to the Museum.
 YouTube: walking toy elephant at Ilkley Toy Museum video)
 Youtube: working fairground at Ilkley Toy Museum video)

Toy museums in England
Museums in the City of Bradford
Museums established in 2002
Museums in West Yorkshire
Ilkley
2002 establishments in England